The 1983 Pacific Coast Athletic Association men's basketball tournament (now known as the Big West Conference men's basketball tournament) was held March 10–12 at The Forum in Inglewood, California.

Top-seeded conference newcomers UNLV defeated two-time defending champions  in the final, 66–63 (OT), thus capturing the Runnin' Rebels' first PCAA/Big West title.

UNLV, in turn, received a bid to the 1983 NCAA tournament, the program's fourth appearance. PCAA third-place finisher Utah State also participated.

Format
The tournament field increased by one from 1982 with the addition of UNLV to the PCAA. Nonetheless, conference member UC Santa Barbara again did not participate in the league tournament.

With eight teams participating, all eight teams were placed into the first round, with teams seeded and paired based on regular-season records. After the first round, teams were re-seeded so the highest-remaining team was paired with the lowest-remaining time in one semifinal with the other two teams slotted into the other semifinal.

Bracket

References

Big West Conference men's basketball tournament
Tournament
Pacific Coast Athletic Association men's basketball tournament
Pacific Coast Athletic Association men's basketball tournament